The United States District Court for the Northern District of California (in case citations, N.D. Cal.)  is the federal United States district court whose jurisdiction comprises the following counties of California: Alameda, Contra Costa, Del Norte, Humboldt, Lake, Marin, Mendocino, Monterey, Napa, San Benito, San Francisco, San Mateo, Santa Clara, Santa Cruz, and Sonoma. The court hears cases in its courtrooms in Eureka, Oakland, San Francisco, and San Jose. It is headquartered in San Francisco.

Cases from the Northern District of California are appealed to the United States Court of Appeals for the Ninth Circuit (except for patent claims and claims against the U.S. government under the Tucker Act, which are appealed to the Federal Circuit).

Because it covers San Francisco and Silicon Valley, the Northern District of California has become known as the presumptive destination for major federal lawsuits (such as large class actions and multi-district litigation) involving defendants based in East Asia and the high tech sector.
 These cases usually involve patent law and intellectual property law (such as copyright law and DMCA issues as well as trademark law and trade secret law) - especially in the semiconductor, telecommunications and software industries and other high technology areas, antitrust law, securities law, and technology law in general (e.g., cybersecurity, Internet law, computer law and cases involving software).

History

California was admitted as a state on September 9, 1850, and was initially divided into two districts, the Northern and the Southern, by Act of Congress approved September 28, 1850, 9 Stat. 521. The boundary line was at the 37th parallel of North Latitude. The creating act provided that:

In addition to the ordinary jurisdiction and powers of a District Court of the United States, with which the Southern District Court of New York has been invested, the said Courts be and hereby are invested respectively within the limits of its district with the exercise of concurrent jurisdiction and power in all civil cases now exercised by the Circuit Courts of the United States; and that in all cases where said Courts shall exercise such jurisdiction, appeals may be taken from the judgments, orders or decrees of said Courts to the Supreme Court of the United States.

The Act of August 31, 1852 made the Judge of the Northern District be Judge of the Southern District as well until otherwise provided, by 10 Stat. 76, 84, effectively creating a single District in all but name until an Act of January 18, 1854 provided for the appointment of a Judge for the Southern District. The Southern District of California was abolished and the State made to constitute a single district – the United States District Court for the District of California – by Act of Congress approved July 27, 1866, 14 Stat. 300.

Twenty years later, on August 5, 1886, Congress re-created the Southern District of California by 24 Stat. 308. Erskine M. Ross was appointed Judge of the new district and served until his promotion to the Circuit Judgeship, when he was succeeded by Olin Wellborn. On March 18, 1966, the Eastern and Central Districts were created from portions of the Northern and Southern Districts by 80 Stat. 75.

Current judges
:

Vacancies and pending nominations

Former judges

Chief judges

Succession of seats

United States Attorney
The United States Attorney for the Northern District of California represents the United States in civil and criminal litigation in the court.  the United States Attorney is Stephanie Hinds.

See also
 Courts of California
 List of current United States district judges
 List of United States federal courthouses in California

References

External links
 United States District Court for the Northern District of California Official Main, misconduct and ombudsperson websites
 United States Attorney for the Northern District of California Official Website
 Community History Exhibits at San Francisco Court facilities

 
California, Northern District
San Francisco
San Jose, California
Oakland, California
1850 establishments in California
1866 disestablishments in California
1886 establishments in California
Courts and tribunals established in 1850
Courts and tribunals disestablished in 1866
Courts and tribunals established in 1886